Pomroy Lake is a lake in Kanabec County, in the U.S. state of Minnesota.

Pomroy Lake was named for John Pomroy, a lumberman.

See also
List of lakes in Minnesota

References

Lakes of Minnesota
Lakes of Kanabec County, Minnesota